Ronny Douglas Stollings (born April 24, 1955) is a Democratic member of the West Virginia Senate, who represented the 7th district from 2006 to 2022. The 7th District is based in Southern West Virginia, covering all of Boone, Lincoln, and Logan Counties and parts of Mingo and Wayne Counties. Stollings' success in the district is notable, considering Donald Trump won the district by a 78%-19% margin in 2016, which was Trump’s best performance in any of the state’s 17 Senate districts.

Politics 
During his time in the Senate, Stollings has served as Vice Chair of the Committee on Health and Human Resources during the 78th and 79th Legislatures (2006-2010); Chair of the Committee on Confirmations during the 79th Legislature (2008-2010); and Chair of the Committee on Health and Human Resources during the 80th and 81st Legislatures (2010-2014).

Stollings ran for governor in 2020, finishing third in the Democratic primary, behind Kanawha County Commissioner Ben Salango and community organizer Stephen Smith.

Election results

References

External links
West Virginia Legislature - Senator Ron Stollings official government website
Project Vote Smart - Senator Ron Stollings (WV) profile
Follow the Money - Ron Stollings
2008 2006 2002 Senate campaign contributions

1955 births
21st-century American politicians
American Protestants
Living people
Marshall University alumni
People from Madison, West Virginia
Physicians from West Virginia
Democratic Party West Virginia state senators
West Virginia University alumni
Candidates in the 2020 United States elections